Pedro González López (born 25 November 2002), known as Pedri, is a Spanish professional footballer who plays as a central midfielder for La Liga club Barcelona and the Spain national team. He is considered to be one of the best young players in the world. In 2021, he won the Golden Boy award and received the Kopa Trophy, awarded by FIFA during the 2021 Ballon d'Or ceremony.

Early life
Born in Bajamar, Tenerife, Canary Islands, Pedri's family moved to Tegueste, a nearby town, when he was 3. Pedri joined UD Tegueste, starting as a centre-back. At 12, Pedri signed for CF Juventud Laguna, where he played until 2018.

Club career

Las Palmas
Pedri joined Las Palmas's youth setup in 2018 from Juventud Laguna. On 15 July 2019, aged only 16, he signed a professional four-year contract with the club, being promoted to the first team by manager Pepe Mel.

Pedri made his professional debut on 18 August 2019, aged only 16, by starting in a 0–1 home loss against Huesca in the Segunda División. He scored his first professional goal on 19 September, with the game's only goal in a home victory over Sporting Gijón and became the youngest goalscorer in Las Palmas history at 16 years, 9 months and 23 days of age.

Barcelona
On 2 September 2019, Barcelona reached an agreement with Las Palmas for the transfer of Pedri, effective as of the following 1 July 2020. The player agreed to a two-year contract with the Catalan club, who paid €5 million for the deal, which would increase as he fulfilled various clauses in his contract. Assigned to the main squad for the 2020–21 season and with the number 16 shirt, Pedri made his debut on 27 September, replacing Philippe Coutinho in a 4–0 home win against Villarreal in La Liga. He received his first start on 17 October in a 0–1 away loss against Getafe. On 20 October, Pedri scored his first goal for the club on his UEFA Champions League debut, in a 5–1 win over Ferencváros in the group stage, after coming on as a substitute in the 61st minute for Ansu Fati. On 7 November, in a 5–2 home win over Real Betis, he scored his first goal in La Liga after an assist from Sergi Roberto.

On 6 January 2021, he scored a headed goal against Athletic Bilbao and assisted Barcelona's second goal in a 3–2 win at San Mamés. On 17 April, Pedri won the first trophy of his senior career after Barcelona beat Athletic 4–0 in the Copa del Rey final. On 8 May, at 18 years and 164 days, Pedri made his 50th appearance for Barcelona in all competitions when he started in the 0–0 draw against Atlético Madrid at Camp Nou, thus becoming the second-youngest player to reach this milestone after Bojan Krkić, who was 18 years and 3 days when he reached 50 appearances. In the middle of October 2021 Pedri signed a new contract with Barcelona which contained a record €1 billion ($1.57 billion) release clause.   

On 22 November 2021, Pedri won the Golden Boy award presented by Tuttosport for being the best player in European football under the age of 21. The following week he also received the 2021 Kopa Trophy, awarded by France Football, for being the best performing player in world football under the age of 21.  

On 13 February 2022, Pedri scored the fastest Derbi Barceloní goal of the 21st century, clocking in at 75 seconds in a 2–2 draw against Espanyol. 

On 14 April 2022, Pedri picked up a hamstring injury during Barcelona's second legged quarter-final Europa League clash with Frankfurt, in which they were eliminated. Subsequently, it was announced that Pedri could miss the rest of the season.

On 28 January 2023, Pedri made his 100th appearance in all competitions in a La Liga game against Girona. He was brought on in the 26th minute for injured Ousmane Dembélé and scored the only goal in the match.

International career

Youth career and early senior career
On 21 August 2020, Pedri was called up to the Spain under-21 squad; he later made his debut on 3 September in a 1–0 away win over Macedonia in a qualifying match for the 2021 UEFA European Under-21 Championship.

In March 2021, Pedri received his first call up to the Spain senior team from coach Luis Enrique ahead of the group stage of the 2022 FIFA World Cup qualification. He made his debut on 25 March against Greece.

Euro 2020
On 24 May 2021, Pedri was included in Luis Enrique's 24-man squad for UEFA Euro 2020. On 14 June, he became the youngest player ever to represent Spain at the European Championships, when he started in the 0–0 draw against Sweden aged 18 years, 6 months and 18 days, breaking the previous record set by Miguel Tendillo in Euro 1980. On 28 June, Pedri became the youngest player to feature in a knock-out game at the European Championships when he started in the last-16 against Croatia, aged 18 years and 215 days; however, he scored an own goal when goalkeeper Unai Simón failed to control his long backpass. Spain eventually won match the 5–3 in extra-time. He played all but one minute of Spain's six matches, and had an important impact on Spain's run to the semifinal, where they were defeated 4–2 on penalties by eventual winners Italy following a 1–1 draw after extra-time; during the latter match, he completed 65 of the 66 passes he attempted. For his performances, he was voted the Young Player of the Tournament, and was the only Spanish player in the tournament to be named in the Team of the Tournament.

2020 Summer Olympics
On 29 June 2021, Pedri was called up to the Spain squad for the 2020 Summer Olympics. The move to include Pedri in Spain's Olympic squad attracted criticism from Barcelona, with manager Ronald Koeman branding the decision to call up Pedri for two international tournaments in the same summer as "too much". On 22 July, Pedri played the full 90 minutes in Spain's 0–0 opener against Egypt. The game was Pedri's 66th of the season. In the final, Pedri's 73rd game of the season, Spain suffered a 2–1 loss to Brazil in extra-time.

2022 FIFA World Cup
Pedri was named in Spain's squad for the 2022 FIFA World Cup in Qatar. He started in all four Spain's matches and were later knocked out by Morocco in the Round of 16 on Penalties.

Style of play
Pedri usually plays in a free midfield role, which allows him to roam the pitch; he likes to occupy central areas and operate between the lines, although he is also capable of moving out wide and running towards the touchline to create chances for teammates. He even drops deep to the defence to pick up the ball. He normally situates himself on either the left or right flank, or even as a number 8. Indeed, although he initially played as a winger, he was later moved to a central midfield role, although he is also capable of playing as an attacking midfielder, as well as in several other offensive and midfield roles. He has also occasionally been used as a defensive midfielder and even as a centre-forward.

Pedri is a quick, intelligent, creative, and hard-working player, who is known for his excellent technical skills, ball control, passing, awareness, and vision, as well as his ability to manage himself in tight spaces, exploit gaps, and play the final ball or penetrating passes, which makes him an effective playmaker. Moreover, he is also highly regarded for his dribbling skills, his stamina, his calm composure under pressure, and his ability to play with either foot. His role has been likened to that of a mezzala in the Italian sports media. His slight frame, qualities, position, and playing style have led him to be compared to former Barcelona players such as Xavi, Andrés Iniesta, Michael Laudrup, and Lionel Messi.

Career statistics

Club

International

Honours
Barcelona
Copa del Rey: 2020–21
Supercopa de España: 2022–23

Spain U23
Summer Olympic silver medal: 2020

Individual
UEFA Champions League Breakthrough XI: 2020
UEFA European Championship Young Player of the Tournament: 2020
UEFA European Championship Team of the Tournament: 2020
Trofeo Aldo Rovira: 2020–21
Golden Boy: 2021
Kopa Trophy: 2021
IFFHS World's Best Youth (U20) Player: 2021
IFFHS Men's World Youth (U20) Team: 2021, 2022
IFFHS Men's Youth (U20) UEFA Team: 2021, 2022
 La Liga Team of the Season: 2021–22

References

External links

Profile at the FC Barcelona website

2002 births
Living people
People from Tenerife
Sportspeople from the Province of Santa Cruz de Tenerife
Footballers from the Canary Islands
Spanish footballers
Association football midfielders
UD Las Palmas players
FC Barcelona players
Segunda División players
La Liga players
Spain youth international footballers
Spain under-21 international footballers
Spain international footballers
UEFA Euro 2020 players
2022 FIFA World Cup players
Olympic footballers of Spain
Footballers at the 2020 Summer Olympics
Olympic medalists in football
Olympic silver medalists for Spain
Medalists at the 2020 Summer Olympics